Eastern European Summer Time (EEST) is one of the names of the UTC+03:00 time zone, which is 3 hours ahead of Coordinated Universal Time. It is used as a summer daylight saving time in some European and Middle Eastern countries, which makes it the same as Arabia Standard Time, East Africa Time, and Moscow Time. During the winter periods, Eastern European Time (UTC+02:00) is used.

Since 1996, European Summer Time has been applied from the last Sunday in March to the last Sunday in October. Previously, the rules were not uniform across the European Union.

Usage
The following countries and territories use Eastern European Summer Time during the summer:

 Belarus, Moscow Summer Time in years 1981–89, regular EEST from 1991-2011
 Bulgaria, regular EEST since 1979
 Cyprus, regular EEST since 1979 (Northern Cyprus stopped using EEST in September 2016, but returned to EEST in March 2018)
 Estonia, Moscow Summer Time in years 1981–88, regular EEST since 1989
 Finland, regular EEST since 1981
 Greece, regular EEST since 1975
 Israel, Israel Daylight Time since 1948 (which tracks EEST when the two overlap)
 Jordan, since 1985
 Latvia, Moscow Summer Time in years 1981–88, regular EEST since 1989
 Lebanon, since 1984
 Lithuania, Moscow Summer Time in years 1981–88, regular EEST since 1989, apart from in years 1998-2003 when it was Central European Summer Time
 Moldova, Moscow Summer Time in years 1932–40 and 1981–89, regular EEST since 1991
 Romania, unofficial EEST in years 1932–40, regular EEST since 1979
 Russia (Kaliningrad), Moscow Summer Time in years 1981–90, regular EEST since 1991, as standard time from March 2011.
 Syria, since 1983
 Ukraine, Moscow Summer Time in years 1981–89, regular EEST from 1992

In the year 1991, EEST was used also in Moscow and Samara time zones of Russia. Egypt has previously used EEST in 1957–2010 and 2014–2015. Turkey, has previously used EEST in 1970–1978, EEST and Moscow Summer Time in 1979–1983, and EEST in 1985–2016.

See also
 European Summer Time
 UTC+03:00

References

Time zones
Time in Europe
Geography of Eastern Europe